In human sexuality, kinkiness is the use of non-conventional sexual practices, concepts or fantasies. The term derives from the idea of a "bend" (cf. a "kink") in one's sexual behaviour, to contrast such behaviour with "straight" or "vanilla" sexual mores and proclivities. It is thus a colloquial term for non-normative sexual behaviour. The term "kink" has been claimed by some who practice sexual fetishism as a term or synonym for their practices, indicating a range of sexual and sexualistic practices from playful to sexual objectification and certain paraphilias. In the 21st century the term "kink", along with expressions like BDSM, leather and fetish, has become more commonly used than the term paraphilia. Some universities also feature student organizations focused on kinks, within the context of wider LGBTQ concerns. 

Kink sexual practices go beyond what are considered conventional sexual practices as a means of heightening the intimacy between sexual partners. Some draw a distinction between kink and fetishism, defining the former as enhancing partner intimacy, and the latter as replacing it. Because of its relation to conformist sexual boundaries, which themselves vary by time and place, the definition of what is and is not a kink varies widely as well.

In a study published in 2016 it was found that nearly half of respondents reported an interest in some form of paraphilia and about a third had engaged in paraphilic behavior at least once.

See also

Alt porn
Dominance and submission
Glossary of BDSM
Kink.com
Master/slave (BDSM)
Kink Aware Professionals (KAP)
Risk-aware consensual kink (RACK)
Safe, sane and consensual (SSC)
Sexual roleplay
Sex shop

References

Further reading
 Sensual, Erotic, and Sexual Behaviors of Women from the “Kink” Community Sensual, Erotic, and Sexual Behaviors of Women from the "Kink" Community, Articles of Sexual Behavior, International Academy of Sex Research
 Kinky - The Sensual Consciousness, The Sultry Revolution of the Senses, Chic Today Magazine
 Dossie Easton, Catherine A. Liszt, When Someone You Love Is Kinky,  Greenery Press, 2000. .
 
 
 International Association of Rubberists
 Jay Wiseman, SM 101: A Realistic Introduction, Greenery Press, 2000, .
 Stephanie Clifford-Smith, Kink: A Straight Girl's Investigation, Allen and Unwin, 2010, 

BDSM terminology
Fetish subculture